Bloomfield is a village in Ontario County, New York, United States. The population was 1,361 at the 2010 census.

The Village of Bloomfield is in the Town of East Bloomfield and is west of Canandaigua.

History 
The village was part of the Phelps and Gorham Purchase (1788). It was incorporated in 1990 to combine the two adjacent communities of Holcomb and East Bloomfield.

The St. Bridget's Roman Catholic Church Complex and St. Peter's Episcopal Church are listed on the National Register of Historic Places.

Geography
Bloomfield is located at  (42.899218, -77.429623).

The village is mostly situated between New York State Route 444 and conjoined US 20/New York State Route 5.  New York State Route 64 also joins US-20 west of the village.

Fish Creek flows past the north side of the village, a tributary of Ganargua Creek and connects to the north with Erie Canal.

Demographics

As of the census of 2000, there were 1,267 people, 474 households, and 346 families residing in the village. The population density was 900.2 people per square mile (346.9/km2). There were 497 housing units at an average density of 353.1 per square mile (136.1/km2). The racial makeup of the village was 97.95% White, 0.95% African American, 0.16% Native American, 0.08% Pacific Islander, 0.32% from other races, and 0.55% from two or more races. Hispanic or Latino of any race were 1.03% of the population.

There were 474 households, out of which 50.0% had children under the age of 18 living with them, 57.6% were married couples living together, 11.6% had a female householder with no husband present, and 27.0% were non-families. 19.8% of all households were made up of individuals, and 6.5% had someone living alone who was 65 years of age or older. The average household size was 2.62 and the average family size was 3.00.

In the village, the population was spread out, with 26.4% under the age of 18, 7.8% from 18 to 24, 31.9% from 25 to 44, 23.0% from 45 to 64, and 10.8% who were 65 years of age or older. The median age was 36 years. For every 100 females, there were 93.1 males. For every 100 females age 18 and over, there were 91.8 males.

The median income for a household in the village was $47,663, and the median income for a family was $53,977. Males had a median income of $35,197 versus $24,485 for females. The per capita income for the village was $23,669. About 3.0% of families and 4.1% of the population were below the poverty line, including 3.6% of those under age 18 and 1.4% of those age 65 or over.

Notable people

 Eunice Newton Foote, civil rights activist and the first scientist known to have experimented on the warming effect of sunlight on different gases
Jonathan Child, first Mayor of Rochester, New York
Paulina Kellogg Wright Davis, abolitionist, suffragist, and educator
Ryan Lochte, American professional swimmer and 12-time Olympic medalist, attended Bloomfield central school.
William Ketchum, former Mayor of Buffalo, New York
Wayne Barker, Tony nominated composer for the musical Peter and the Starcatcher, graduated from Bloomfield High School.
Kaitlyn Tiffany, staff writer for the Atlantic and author of the novel Everything I Need I Get From You: How Fangirls Created the Internet as We Know It, graduated from Bloomfield High School in 2011.

Economy

Crosman Corporation is based in Bloomfield with their headquarters located on Highway 5.
Other Half Brewing Company is located at 6621 State Route 5 & 20.

References

External links

  Village of Bloomfield, NY
	
	

Villages in New York (state)
Rochester metropolitan area, New York
Villages in Ontario County, New York
1990 establishments in New York (state)